The 7th Signal Regiment is a deployable signals regiment of the Italian Army based in Sacile in Friuli-Venezia Giulia. In 1918 during World War I the regiment was formed as 7th Engineer Regiment (Telegraphers) with 59 companies transferred from the 3rd Engineer Regiment (Telegraphers). In 1920 the regiment was disbanded and its companies formed into battalions, which were assigned the army's army corps commands.

The unit was reformed in 1948 as a battalion and given the number V, which had been used by two battalions active during World War II. During the Cold War the battalion was assigned to the V Army Corps. In 1975 the battalion was named for the Rolle Pass and assigned the flag and traditions of the 7th Engineer Regiment (Telegraphers). In 1991 the battalion was redesignated as regiment. In 2002 the regiment reformed the Battalion "Predil" as its second signal battalion. The regiment is assigned to the army's Signal Command and affiliated with the Division "Vittorio Veneto".

History

World War I 
Towards the end of World War I the 7th Engineer Regiment (Telegraphers) was formed on 1 July 1918 in Piacenza. The 3rd Engineer Regiment (Telegraphers) transferred its branch depots in Piacenza, Verona, and Mantua to the new regiment. The 3rd also transferred 59 telegraphers companies it had formed for service on the Italian front. The 7th trained replacement personnel for the companies it had received and formed one more telegraphers company before the war's end.

After the war the regiment was disbanded on 31 March 1920 and its companies used to form a telegraphers battalion for each army corps on 1 April 1920.

Cold War 
On 1 May 1948 a Connections Battalion was formed in Padua as support unit of the V Territorial Military Command. In March 1950 the battalion was numbered V Connections Battalion and became the spiritual successor of the V Telegraphers Battalion and V Marconists Battalion, which had been formed by the 2nd Engineer Regiment during World War II. On 1 October 1952 the Connections Speciality became an autonomous speciality of the Engineer Arm, with its own school and gorget patches. On 16 May 1953 the speciality adopted the name Signal Speciality and consequently the V Connections Battalion was renamed V Signal Battalion on the same date. In January 1954 the battalion was renamed V Army Corps Signal Battalion and consisted of a command, an operations company, a line construction company, and a signal center. In 1961 the battalion formed a second line construction company. In 1965 the battalion moved from Padua to Codroipo.

During the 1975 army reform the army disbanded the regimental level and newly independent battalions were granted for the first time their own flags. During the reform signal battalions were renamed for mountain passes. On 1 October 1975 the V Army Corps Signal Battalion was renamed 5th Signal Battalion "Rolle" and assigned the flag and traditions of the 7th Engineer Regiment (Telegraphers).

The 5th Signal Battalion "Rolle" consisted of a command, a command and services platoon, four signal companies, and a repairs and recovery platoon. In 1976 the battalion moved from Codroipo to Sacile. On 1 June 1989 the battalion was reorganized and consisted now of a command, a command and services company, a radio relay company, and two signal center companies. In 1991 the battalion added a second radio relay company.

Recent times 
On 4 October 1991 the 5th Signal Battalion "Rolle" was renamed Signal Regiment "Rolle", which was renamed 7th Signal Regiment on 1 December 1992. On the same date the flag and traditions of the 7th Engineer Regiment (Telegraphers) were transferred from the battalion to the 7th Signal Regiment.

In 2000 the regiment joined the army's C4 IEW Command. On 8 January 2002 the regiment received the reformed Battalion "Predil" and became a projection signal regiment capable to deploy and operate outside Italy.

Current structure 
As of 2022 the 7th Signal Regiment consists of:

  Regimental Command, in Sacile
 Command and Logistic Support Company
  Battalion "Rolle"
 1st Signal Company
 2nd Signal Company
 3rd Signal Company
  Battalion "Predil"
 4th Signal Company
 5th Signal Company
 6th Signal Company

The Command and Logistic Support Company fields the following platoons: C3 Platoon, Transport and Materiel Platoon, Medical Platoon, and Commissariat Platoon.

External links
Italian Army Website: 7° Reggimento Trasmissioni

References

Signal Regiments of Italy